Peter Verschuren is a retired Dutch mixed martial artist. He competed in the Heavyweight division.

Mixed martial arts record

|-
| Loss
| align=center| 2-6
| Joop Kasteel
| DQ
| It's Showtime: Amsterdam Arena
| 
| align=center| 1
| align=center| 5:00
| Amsterdam, North Holland, Netherlands
| 
|-
| Loss
| align=center| 2-5
| Michael Knaap
| Submission (leglock)
| 2H2H 6: Simply the Best 6
| 
| align=center| 1
| align=center| 3:26
| Rotterdam, South Holland, Netherlands
| 
|-
| Loss
| align=center| 2-4
| Antoni Hardonk
| TKO (doctor stoppage)
| Rings Holland: Heroes Live Forever
| 
| align=center| 1
| align=center| 3:05
| Utrecht, Netherlands
| 
|-
| Loss
| align=center| 2-3
| Alistair Overeem
| Submission (americana)
| It's Showtime: Christmas Edition
| 
| align=center| 1
| align=center| 1:06
| Haarlem, North Holland, Netherlands
| 
|-
| Loss
| align=center| 2-2
| Rob van Esdonk
| Submission (scarf-hold armlock)
| Rings Holland: Di Capo Di Tutti Capi
| 
| align=center| 1
| align=center| 2:41
| Utrecht, Netherlands
| 
|-
| Win
| align=center| 2-1
| Renaldo Rijkhoff
| KO (knee)
| Rings Holland: There Can Only Be One Champion
| 
| align=center| 1
| align=center| 3:13
| Utrecht, Netherlands
| 
|-
| Loss
| align=center| 1-1
| Piet van Gammeren
| Decision (unanimous)
| Rings Holland: The Kings of the Magic Ring
| 
| align=center| 3
| align=center| 3:00
| Utrecht, Netherlands
| 
|-
| Win
| align=center| 1-0
| Herman van Tol
| TKO (3 knockdowns)
| IMA: Mix Fight Gala
| 
| align=center| N/A
| align=center| N/A
| Landsmeer, North Holland, Netherlands
|

See also
List of male mixed martial artists

References

Dutch male mixed martial artists
Heavyweight mixed martial artists
Living people
Place of birth missing (living people)
Year of birth missing (living people)